Dario Della Valle (31 March 1899 – 1944) was an Italian boxer who competed in the 1920 Summer Olympics. In 1920 he was eliminated in the first round of the welterweight class after losing his fight to Aage Steen.

References

External links
Dario Della Valle's profile at Sports Reference.com
Report on Italian Olympic boxers 

1899 births
1944 deaths
Welterweight boxers
Olympic boxers of Italy
Boxers at the 1920 Summer Olympics
Italian male boxers